The Rest is Silence is an album by Randy, released in 1996.

Track listing
"Snorty Pacifical Rascal"
"Utilizing Peanuts"
"At Any Cost"
"Where Our Heart Is"
"All Eaten Up"
"No More The Meek"
"You're Eating From Their Hand"
"On The Rack"
"The Beginning"
"Kiss Me Deadly"
"Whom To Blame"

Information
 recorded by Randy in a red house
 mixed at Music A Matic in Gothenburg
 released by Dolores Records 1996
 performed by Randy
 title is taken from the final words of Hamlet in the play of the same name.

1996 albums
Randy (band) albums